Gertrude is a ghost town in Pocahontas County, West Virginia, United States. Gertrude appeared on West Virginia Geological Survey maps as late as 1929.

References

Geography of Pocahontas County, West Virginia
Ghost towns in West Virginia